Steve Fainaru (born 1962) is an American investigative journalist and senior writer for ESPN.com and ESPN The Magazine. He was previously a correspondent for the Washington Post, where his coverage of the Iraq War earned him the Pulitzer Prize for International Reporting in 2008. He left the Post in 2010 and became managing editor of The Bay Citizen, a San Francisco Bay Area news organization.  He co-wrote League of Denial with his brother Mark Fainaru-Wada, a book about traumatic brain injury in the National Football League, which earned Fainaru and his brother the 2014 PEN/ESPN Award for Literary Sports Writing.

Fainaru was born in Mountain View, California, and grew up in Marin County. He attended Redwood High School in Larkspur, and graduated from the University of Missouri in 1984. He returned to the Bay Area and worked for the San Jose Mercury News, then moved to the East coast, working for the Hartford Courant (Connecticut) from 1986 to 1989, then The Boston Globe, where he was named the Globe New York bureau chief. He earned a master's degree in international affairs at Columbia University in 1992. From 1995 to 1998 he was the Globe Latin American bureau chief, based in Mexico City.

References

Selected publications

External links

Steve Făinaru, distins cu premiul Pulitzer :„Vizita în România a fost un vis!”

1962 births
Living people
Pulitzer Prize for International Reporting winners
People from Mountain View, California
University of Missouri alumni
The Boston Globe people
The Washington Post people
ESPN people
American investigative journalists
American war correspondents
School of International and Public Affairs, Columbia University alumni
The Mercury News people
Sportswriters from California
American people of Romanian descent
Redwood High School (Larkspur, California) alumni